Wang Hongliang (born 14 January 1985) is a Chinese football player as a midfielder.

Club career

Shanghai Shenhua
Wang Hongliang started his football career with top tier side Shanghai Shenhua after he graduated from their youth team in the 2005 Chinese league season where he would make his debut against Changsha Ginde on 2 July 2005 which saw Shanghai win 6-1. Throughout the rest of the season Wang would be used sparsely to gain more playing time, his progression would continue throughout the rest of 2006 league season where he played a larger role throughout Shenhua's campaign and eventually played in fifteen league games throughout the campaign.

At the beginning of the 2007 league season the introduction of several midfielders from the emergence of Shanghai United saw many players dropped, yet despite a drop in playing time Wang was still able to make an impact by starting in several league games for Shanghai. With a fresh start at the beginning of the 2008 league season, which saw the overhaul of many players Wang could continue to remain as a squad player and predominantly be used as a substitute for Shenhua.

Shenzhen Ruby
The following seasons at Shenhua saw Wang unable to gain significantly more playing time and would go on to miss much of the 2010 league season through injury, this saw the club release Wang before he joined top tier club Shenzhen Ruby with team mate Chen Lei. His time at Shenzhen was a huge disappointment and due to a knee injury he missed the entire league season while the club were relegated, which ultimately saw the club decide to let Wang join second tier club Chongqing Lifan.

References

External links
Player profile at Sina.com
Player stats at Football-lineups.com
Player stats at Fifa.com
Player stats at Sohu.com

1985 births
Living people
Chinese footballers
Footballers from Shanghai
Shanghai Shenhua F.C. players
Shenzhen F.C. players
Chongqing Liangjiang Athletic F.C. players
Chinese Super League players
China League One players
Association football midfielders